Pongadi Neengalum Unga Kadhalum is a 2014 Tamil-language film directed by Ramakrishnan in his directorial debut. The film stars himself, alongside Athmiya Rajan, and debutant Karunya in the lead roles, while Jayaprakash plays the main antagonist.

Cast 
 Ramakrishnan as Ramakrishnan
 Athmiya Rajan as Divya
 Karunya as Divya's friend 
 Jayaprakash as a police commissioner
 Sendrayan as Ramakrishnan's friend
 Ashmitha as Sameera
 Imman Annachi as a police officer
 Swaminathan as a police Inspector
 V. R. Nagendran as Police Inspector
 Nilesh Rai as himself
 Baba Bhaskar (special appearance in "Oru Ponnu")

Soundtrack 
The music was composed by Kannan, who previously composed the songs for Thamizh Padam. The songs were released in November 2013 to positive reviews. Bhagyaraj, Vikraman, Cheran, Samuthirakani, Mysskin and Karu Pazhaniappan were present at the audio launch.
"Vaa Maa" – M. L. R. Karthikeyan, Srilekha Parthasarathy
"Ye Kadhale" – Thanjai Selvi
"Oru Ponnu" – Gaana Bala, Kannan
"Chuda Chuda" – Haricharan, Elizabeth Malini
"Thaaru Maara" – Mukesh Mohamed

Release 
Udhav Naig of The Hindu stated that "Pongadi Neengalum Unga Kadhalum is nothing but a more-than-two-hour conservative rant".  The Times of India stated that "This film tells us that it is in the nature of women to expect praise and failure to do so by the men is what leads them to go astray".

References

External links 

2010s Tamil-language films
Indian romantic drama films
2014 directorial debut films
2014 romantic drama films